The 2019–20 CSA Provincial T20 Cup was a domestic Twenty cricket tournament that took place in South Africa in September 2019, as a curtain-raiser to the 2019–20 South African domestic season. It was played between the thirteen South African provincial teams, along with Limpopo and Mpumalanga. This was the sixth edition of the CSA Provincial T20 Cup, which was last played in the 2015–16 season. With only domestic teams from South Africa taking part, the tournament returned in place of the Africa T20 Cup, which had been held since 2015.

On the opening day of matches, Jonathan Vandiar scored an unbeaten century for Northerns against Gauteng in Pool A. In Pool B, Lauren Agenbag became the first woman to umpire in a senior men's provincial match, when she was one of the on-field umpires in the match between Eastern Province and KwaZulu-Natal Inland. In Pool C, the match between Western Province cricket team and North West finished in a tie, with North West winning the Super Over.

Day two of the tournament saw the second tied match in as many days, as KwaZulu-Natal and Easterns finished level on runs in Pool A, with Easterns winning the Super Over. In Pool B, Jacques Snyman scored 117 runs from 58 balls, as Northern Cape beat South Western Districts by 82 runs. Finally in Pool C, Lerato Kgoatle scored his second century in four innings, as Limpopo beat Western Province by 10 wickets.

The third and final day of round-robin matches saw KwaZulu-Natal tie their second match in as many days in Pool A, eventually winning the Super Over against Free State. Easterns, Eastern Province and Border all won their respective groups to progress to the finals of the tournament. They were joined by KwaZulu-Natal Inland, the next best team overal, who finished second in Pool B, and above Limpopo in Pool C on net run rate.

On 16 September 2019, Cricket South Africa confirmed the draw for the semi-final matches. Eastern Province played KwaZulu-Natal Inland in the first semi-final, and Easterns faced Border in the second match. All the knock-out fixtures, including the final, took place at Willowmoore Park in Benoni. KwaZulu-Natal Inland won their semi-final by 21 runs, with Easterns winning their match by nine wickets, with both teams advancing to the final. Easterns won the tournament, beating KwaZulu-Natal Inland by five runs in the final. Grant Thomson, the captain of the Easterns team, said that "it was an excellent game, an excellent final and great end to the competition".

Pool A

Squads

Points table

Fixtures

Pool B

Squads

Points table

Fixtures

Pool C

Squads

Points table

Fixtures

Finals

References

External links
 Series home at ESPN Cricinfo

South African domestic cricket competitions
CSA Provincial T20 Cup
2019–20 South African cricket season